Qaleh Dokhtar (also Romanized as Qal‘eh Dokhtar; also known as Dokhtar, Kalāteh Dukhtar, and Kūh-e Dokhtar) is a village in Afin Rural District, Zohan District, Zirkuh County, South Khorasan Province, Iran. At the 2006 census, its population was 47, in 13 families.

References 

Populated places in Zirkuh County